Emma Kristina Degerstedt (born April 13, 1992) is an American television actress and singer. Degerstedt is of Swedish descent.

Career
Her television roles include Maris in the Nickelodeon series Unfabulous. She has also appeared on stage in the play 13, a 2007 production in which she played Kendra.

In 2003, she played "Baby June" in a 2003 production of Gypsy. In June 2007, she participated in the 2007 Miller Children's Torch Run Celebrities. That same year, she played Teenage Samantha in the ABC sitcom Samantha Who? for one episode. In 2010, she portrayed Barbara in a Huntington Beach Academy for the Performing Arts production of Dark of the Moon.

In December 2012, Degerstedt sang and danced in the production Kritzerland Records' Christmas with a Little Bit of Hannukah and a Lot of Cheer at Sterling's Upstairs at the Federal in North Hollywood. She performed two songs, "Be A Santa" and the solo "Santa Baby". She is currently attending University of California, Los Angeles.

Filmography

Film

Television

Theater

Awards and nominations

References

External links 
 
 
 

1992 births
21st-century American actresses
American child actresses
American television actresses
Living people
Actresses from Long Beach, California
American people of Swedish descent
University of California, Los Angeles alumni